The Id is a 2016 American thriller/horror film, written by Sean H. Stewart and directed by Thommy Hutson. The film stars Amanda Wyss, Patrick Peduto and Jamye Grant. As of February 2019, the film has grossed nearly $8k from DVD and Blu-ray sales.

Plot 
A lonely woman caring for her domineering father is pushed to the brink when a figure from her past re-enters her life.

Cast 
 Amanda Wyss as Meridith Lane
 Patrick Peduto as Father
 Jamye Grant as Tricia
 Malcolm Mathews as Ted
 Karen Leabo as Dana
 Brent Witt as Fantasy Ted and Officer McDaniel
 Stefanie Guarino as Officer Lopez
 Erin Astin as Young Meridith
 Ryan Bouton as Young Ted

Reception 
The Id received favorable reviews, with much of the praise going towards the performance of Wyss, the direction, and writing. However, there is criticism towards the editing and score. Writing for Starburst magazine, James Evans wrote that Wyss gives a "complex performance that anchors the film." Evans also highlighted the writing of Stewart and the direction of Hutson but was critical of the editing for becoming what he believed to be repetitive.

Mark L. Miller of the website Ain't It Cool News had similar praise for Wyss, stating her emotional performance "is what makes this film worth seeking out." In a review for Blu-ray, Dr. Stephen Larson criticized the editing by Marc Cardenas and narrative limitations set up by Hutson and Stewart. Larson describes the film as an "average horror feature."

Winner of Best Thriller at the 2016 Hollywood Reel Independent Film Festival.

References

External links 
 

2016 films
2016 horror thriller films
American horror thriller films
American independent films
2016 independent films
Films set in 2016
2010s English-language films
2010s American films